The 1992–93 Moldovan "A" Division season was the 2nd since its establishment. A total of 14 teams contested the league.

League table

References

Moldovan Liga 1 seasons
2
Moldova